Bình Long is a town of Bình Phước Province in the Southeast region of Vietnam. As of 2009, the district had a population of 57,590 and an area of 126 km². The district capital lies at An Lộc ward.

The town's former name is An Lộc. It is located approximately 90 km north of Ho Chi Minh City with a population of 8,599 (2009). An Lộc was formerly part of Bình Long Province before the merger with Phước Long Province to form Bình Phước Province. It became famous during the Vietnam War for being the location of a major battle in 1972. Today Bình Long has a mass grave memorial with 3,000 bodies.

Geographical location
Bình Long borders Hớn Quản District to the east, west and south, and Lộc Ninh District to the north.

Administrative division
Bình Long consists of 4 wards (phường) and 2 communes (xã):
 Wards: An Lộc, Hưng Chiến, Phú Thịnh, Phú Đức 
 Communes: Thanh Lương, Thanh Phú

Battle of An Lộc, 1972

In North Vietnam's Easter Offensive of 1972, the Politburo member and Army General Võ Nguyên Giáp planned simultaneous attacks to capture as much territory as possible and to defeat the US-supported South Vietnamese Army of the Republic of Vietnam (ARVN). By then, the number of United States ground forces in South Vietnam had fallen to 65,000 from an all-time high of 543,000 in 1969, and the North Vietnamese correctly anticipated that the US was unwilling to commit ground troops again. An aerial armada consisting of United States Air Force (USAF) B-52 Stratofortresses, F-4 Phantom IIs, A-37 Dragonflies and US Navy planes from four aircraft carrier wings and some Republic of Vietnam Air Force (VNAF) fighters, however, were at hand to provide strong and at times crucial air-support.

One of the main attacks of the offensive took place north of Saigon, where three divisions of North Vietnamese People's Army of Vietnam (PAVN) troops from base areas inside Cambodia launched a full-scale invasion starting on April 2, 1972. Quickly overrunning South Vietnamese defensive outposts, the North Vietnamese rolled down Highway 13 towards Saigon.

The ARVN took a stand at An Lộc, led by CG Nguyễn Văn Minh, which was shortly surrounded by PAVN troops. The North Vietnamese forces, for the first time supported by heavy tanks, began their assault on April 13, 1972. A three-day all-out attack failed, after which the battle turned into a prolonged siege with shifting attacks and counter-attacks.  All the while, the town was turned into rubble. Although the North Vietnamese on several occasions breached the defenses, they never managed to deal the defenders a knock-out blow, and An Lộc remained in the hands of the South Vietnamese. By July, the fighting had subsided and An Lộc was relieved on July 11.

Although the ARVN performed well in some regards in An Lộc, USAF air-support and air-borne supplies and reinforcements were key in preventing the fall of the town to the North Vietnamese. As such, the battle failed to convince US policymakers that the South Vietnamese could continue the war on their own. In his memoirs, US Secretary of State Henry Kissinger notes that the South Vietnamese Army never managed to reopen the road into An Lộc.  The battle for An Lộc (Easter Offensive) interrupted the Paris Peace Talks.  Operation Linebacker I brought the communists back to the negotiations.

Three historical figures are linked to An Lộc. Air Force pilot First Lieutenant Michael Blassie died near An Lộc when his A-37B went down on May 11, 1972.  He had been buried in the Tomb of the Unknowns from 1984 to 1998 as the Unknown Service Member from the Vietnam War, before positive identification was obtained through DNA evidence. Colonel William Nolde, the last recorded American combat casualty of the conflict, fell here on January 27, 1973.  The ARVN did have a hero in Brigadier General Lê Văn Hưng (1933–1975), whose remark "If I'm still alive, An Lộc still stands" rallied the troops.  His forces firmly held the city of An Lộc under fierce enemy attacks that lasted two months.  At the end of the war, General Hưng was by then his last military assignment as deputy commander of the IV Corps (known as Military Region 4) at Cần Thơ. In the last weeks of the Republic of Vietnam, General Lê Văn Hưng stabilized the firm control on his ARVN soldiers and officers to prevent the VC taking over Cần Thơ. He and the commander, General Nguyễn Khoa Nam, rather than fleeing the country or surrendering to the communists, committed suicide on April 30, 1975 at Cần Thơ after hearing the order to lay down their arms by General Dương Văn Minh, who had been President of the Republic of Vietnam for just three days. For some South Vietnamese, this month is now known as "Cruel April", and the Communist North Vietnamese finally achieved what they sought in their 1972 Easter Offensive.

In popular culture
An Lộc is mentioned in the epilogue of American Graffiti, which states that "Terry 'Toad' Fields was reported missing in action near An Lộc in December 1965."  This is later expanded upon in the sequel, More American Graffiti. 
An Lộc is also mentioned in Good Morning, Vietnam, as Sgt Major Dickerson requests activity on the road to An Lộc for the trip that Adrian Cronauer (Robin Williams) and Edward Garlick (Forest Whitaker) are taking to supposedly "interview" troops in the field.
Ba-Nee, one of the Starlight Girls in Jem, is said to have been born in An Lộc.

See also
Battle of An Lộc
Vietnam War
South Vietnam
Vietnam

References

External links
 The Battle of An Loc - Battle Overview, Photos, Personal Accounts and Links.
 Battle of An Loc (Valiant Binh Long)
Battle of An Loc - by Lieutenant Colonel James H. Willbanks
 Communist Battle Plans for An Lộc
 Vietnam War Internet Project
 Texas Tech University Vietnam Project - Major Vietnam Era Archive.
  Gerald R. Ford Library holdings - Declassified National Security Adviser files of interest
 PBS Battlefield: Vietnam
 Account of ARVN Armor general and last days combat

Districts of Bình Phước province
County-level towns in Vietnam